Wootton is a village and civil parish on the River Glyme about  north of Woodstock, Oxfordshire. In recent years the village is sometimes referred to as Wootton-by-Woodstock to distinguish it from Wootton, Vale of White Horse, which was in Berkshire but was transferred to Oxfordshire in the 1974 local authority boundary changes. The 2011 Census recorded the parish's population as 569.  The parish is bounded to the west partly by the River Glyme, to the north partly by a stream that joins the River Dorn, to the south-east by the course of Akeman Street Roman road, to the south-west by the pale of Blenheim Great Park and on other sides by field boundaries. It includes two deserted medieval villages: Dornford on the River Dorn, and Hordley on the River Glyme just downstream of the confluence of the Dorn and Glyme.

Parish church
The earliest parts of the Church of England parish church of Saint Mary are the nave, north aisle and lower part of the tower, all of which date from the first half of the 13th century, and the south porch, which is Early English.  In the 14th century the chancel and chancel arch were rebuilt and most of the windows in the building were replaced, all in a Decorated Gothic style. The upper part of the bell tower was added in the 15th century and the clerestory was added to the nave in the 16th century, each in a Perpendicular Gothic style.

The tower has a ring of six bells. Edward Hemins of Bicester cast the third, fourth and fifth bells in 1732 and the tenor bell in 1739. Abel Rudhall of Gloucester cast the second bell in 1749 and Mears & Stainbank of the Whitechapel Bell Foundry cast the present treble bell in 1923. St. Mary's also has a Sanctus bell that Thomas Rudhall cast in 1778.  The parish is now part of the benefice of Wootton with Glympton and Kiddington.

Economic and social history
The Domesday Book of 1086 records Wootton as the court of the hundred of Wootton. By the early part of the 16th century this had declined to only five (adult) residents. The Gregory family had converted most of the farmland from arable to pasture which would have done much to reduce the village population. It is arranged around three and a half sides of a quadrangle, possibly following the plan of an earlier medieval house on the same site. The kitchen fireplace and two of the doorways have four-centred arches that date from about 1500, and the north wing has two square-headed windows from the later 16th century. The ground-floor rooms have some 17th-century panelling. In 1750 the house was remodelled and a gazebo was built in the garden.

In 1787 the Rev. Charles Parrott, sometime vicar of Saham Toney in Norfolk, died leaving a bequest for a school to be founded and run in Wootton. Early in the 19th century further schools were added in Wootton, including one run by the rector. In 1836 a new building was completed to merge all education in the village into one school. The Rector, Rev. L.C. Lee, paid towards the cost of the site and gave capital and the income from several cottages to fund the new school. In 1942 it was reorganised as a junior school. It is now Wootton-by-Woodstock Church of England Primary School.  Wootton had two public houses until 2008, when the King's Head closed.

Amenities
The village has one public house, the Killingworth Castle Inn, which was built in 1637. It is now a gastropub that has won a Michelin Bib Gourmand and two AA rosettes. Wootton also has a village store.

References

Sources and further reading

External links

Wootton by Woodstock

Civil parishes in Oxfordshire
Villages in Oxfordshire
West Oxfordshire District